Bobby Howe may refer to:
Bobby Howe (footballer, born 1945), English footballer, player of West Ham United, and coach of the Portland Timbers (2001–2005)
Bobby Howe (footballer, born 1973), English footballer, player of Nottingham Forest, Ipswich Town, Swindon Town, Havant & Waterlooville, and Farnborough Town
Bobby Howe (Scottish footballer) (1903–1979), Scotland international

See also
Robert Howe (disambiguation)